Fort Polk Wildlife Management Area is a  105,545-acre tract of protected area within the United States Army military reservation of Fort Polk, Louisiana. The WMA is located approximately ten miles southeast of Leesville, in Vernon Parish, east of U.S. Highway 171, one mile south of Louisiana Highway 28 and one mile north of Louisiana Highway 10.

See also

List of Louisiana Wildlife Management Areas

References

Wildlife management areas of the United States
Protected areas of Louisiana
Geography of Vernon Parish, Louisiana
Wildlife management areas of Louisiana